Itaya Hazan (1872—1963) was a Japanese artist widely considered a pioneer of modern Japanese ceramics.

Biography
Itaya Hazan was born in Shimodate, Ibaraki Prefecture, as Itaya Kashichi. His father was a soya sauce maker, and he was the youngest of eight children. His alias Hazan, meaning "wavy mountain", comes from the landscape of his native area. In 1889, he entered the Tokyo Art School, where he studied sculpture under Kōun Takamura and Tenshin Okakura. Subsequently, he taught sculpture at the Ishikawa Prefectural Industrial School in Kanazawa. In 1898, the school closed, and Hazan started to study traditional ceramics of China and eventually to work on ceramics. He published a sketchbook Twelve Shapes of Ancient Ceramics in the same year. In 1903, he moved to Tokyo to the Tabata Artists and Writers Village and started to work under the name Hazan. His assistant there was Fukami Sanjiro, and, after Sanjiro left in 1910, Genda Ichimatsu, who stayed an assistant until his death in 1963.

Before the 1900s, Japanese ceramics followed traditional patterns, and the pieces were often anonymous. There was no distinction between fine and applied arts, in the same sense as they were distinct in the West. Hazan was one of the first artists who integrated them with the European (most notably the Art Nouveau) style, thus creating modern Japanese ceramics. Hazan's early work featured relief carved decoration and paid attention to light. Hazan extensively used color throughout his career. He developed two styles in ceramics, saiji and hokosaiji. His first (group) exhibition was in 1906 at the Japan Art Association. At the 1911 Nationwide Ceramics Exhibition Hazan won the top prize.

In the 1910s, ceramics started to develop commercially. Hazan was not happy with this development and decided to withdraw from exhibitions, developing it like fine art instead. In the 1930s, he moved to the classical Chinese tradition.

In 1954, Hazan became the first potter to be awarded the Order of Culture (Bunka Kunsho), the top merit for an artist in Japan. In 1960, he rejected an invitation to become a Living National Treasure.

The largest collection of Hazan's work is hosted by the Idemitsu Museum of Arts.

References

External links 

20th-century Japanese artists
Imperial household artists
Japanese potters
Japanese ceramists